The RKS Liblice 2 are two  tall guyed masts located east of Prague near Liblice, in close proximity of the RKS Liblice 1. The masts carry a special anti-fading cage aerials. Designed by Jan Šťovíček, these supertall towers currently stand as the tallest towers in the world used for broadcasting in the medium-wave range. RKS Liblice-2 was built in 1976, and was used for broadcasting on 639 kHz until December 31st, 2021. During construction, two new transmitter devices of the type Tesla SRV 750 with an output power of 750 kW were installed. At first, these transmitters were switched in parallel for a transmission power of 1500 kW, after 1990 only 750 kW was used for broadcasting.

History 
The original tower were built in 1936, by Karlova Huť; these towers survived World War II without damages.

Events 
 On November 23, 1978, the transmission frequency of the new towers, which was 638 kHz since 1950, was changed to 639 kHz in order to fulfill the regulations of "waveplan" of Geneva.
 On August 27, 2005, a skydiver jumped off one of the masts after gaining illegal access to it. His parachute became accidentally hooked to a backstage insulator. Fortunately, the incident did not get him too close to the cage antenna of the tower, which would likely have led to his death due to the presence of high frequency currents.
 The broadcasts of Czech Radio Prog. 2 ceased  with end of the year 2021.

See also 
 List of masts
 List of tallest structures in Czech
 List of twin buildings and structures

External links 
 Technical data (Czech)
 Photogallery
 Schema of first tower
 Schema of second tower
 
 http://www.prostor-ad.cz/pruvodce/pvychod/cbrod/vysilac.htm

Liblice
Radio masts and towers in Europe
Kolín District